Gigantopecten is a genus of fossil scallops, marine bivalve molluscs in the  family Pectinidae, the scallops.

These facultatively mobile low-level epifaunal suspension feeders lived from the Oligocene to the Quaternary period (from 33.9 to 0.781 Ma).

Species
Species within the genus Gigantopecten include:
 Gigantopecten latissimus (Brocchi, 1814)
 Gigantopecten nodosiformis (Pusch, 1837)
 Gigantopecten pittieri Dall 1912
 Gigantopecten gigas (Schlotheim, 1813)

Description
The shell is thick and biconvex. The left valve is slightly more convex than the right one. The radial ribs are wide, but very shallow. Both auricles are the same size and shape.

Distribution
Fossils of species within this genus have been found in the sediments of the United States, Italy, Algeria, Austria, Cuba, France, Haiti, Hungary, Poland, Slovakia and Iran.

References 

 Bongrain M., 1988,   Gigantopecten du Miocène français (Pectinidae, Bivalvia)

External links
 Natural History Museum of Crete

Pectinidae
Prehistoric bivalve genera